Rhinaplomyia is a genus of flies in the family Tachinidae.

Species
R. echinata Mesnil, 1957
R. nasuta (Villeneuve, 1937)

References

Diptera of Asia
Exoristinae
Tachinidae genera